Bryan Park may refer to several places in the United States:

 Bryan Park (Downsville, Louisiana), a public park in Downsville, Louisiana
 Bryan Park (Miami), a neighborhood in Miami, Florida
 Bryan Park (Richmond, Virginia), a public park in Richmond, Virginia
 Bryan Park, Delaware, a place in Delaware
 Bryan Park (Omaha, Nebraska), a park in Omaha, Nebraska
 Bryan Park (Greensboro, North Carolina)